Christopher Kas and Tim Pütz were the defending champions, but chose not to participate together. Kas teamed up with Dustin Brown, but lost in the semi-finals to James Cluskey and Austin Krajicek. Pütz played alongside Dominik Meffert, but lost in the first round to Sergei Bubka and Sergiy Stakhovsky.

Seeds

Draw

References
 Main Draw

Sparkassen ATP Challenger - Doubles
2014 Doubles